The following is a list of schools in Uva Province, Sri Lanka.

Badulla District

National Schools

Provincial schools

Private schools

International schools

Special schools

Moneragala District

National schools

Provincial schools

Special schools

References

 
Uva Province